Alikhan Beyki (also Romanized as ‘Alīkhān Beykī, ‘Alīkhān Beygī and ‘Alījān Beygī) is a village in Qahan Rural District, Khalajastan District, Qom County, Qom Province, Iran. At the 2006 census, its population was 24, in 5 families.

References 

Populated places in Qom Province